The 2020 Liga 1 de Fútbol Profesional (known as the Liga 1 Movistar 2020 for sponsorship reasons) was the 104th season of the Peruvian Primera División, the highest division of Peruvian football. A total of 20 teams competed in the season with Binacional coming in as defending champions. The season started on 31 January 2020 and concluded on 20 December 2020 with the second leg of the finals. Sporting Cristal won its 20th domestic championship by beating Universitario in the finals by a 3–2 aggregate score.

The competition was suspended between 12 March and 7 August due to the COVID-19 pandemic, being once again suspended that same day after one match had been played. It eventually resumed on 18 August 2020.

Competition format
The season was divided into three stages: Torneo Apertura (Fase 1), Torneo Clausura (Fase 2), and the Playoffs.

The first and second stages were two Apertura and Clausura tournaments, later rebranded as Fase 1 and Fase 2, respectively. In the Apertura tournament, each team played the other teams once for a total of 19 games. Prior to the onset of the COVID-19 pandemic, the Clausura tournament was scheduled to be played in a similar way to the Apertura, with reversed fixtures, however, its format was altered due to the 5-month suspension of the league. For the Clausura, the 20 teams were split into two groups of 10 according to their final placement in the Apertura. Teams played the other teams in their group once, with the winners of both groups playing a final to decide the Clausura winners. Points earned during the Apertura did not carry over during the Clausura. The winners of the Apertura and Clausura stages qualified to the playoffs along with the top two teams of the aggregate table at the end of the season, unless the Apertura and Clausura winners were placed in the top two positions of the aggregate table.

The playoffs to decide the national champion were scheduled to be contested by four teams, which would play two semifinals with the winners playing the final. Since the Apertura winners also ended up in the top two of the aggregate table, they were given a bye to the final and only one semi-final was played by the other two playoff qualifiers. In every stage of the playoffs, the teams with the most points on the aggregate table chose which leg they would play as the home team. If teams were tied in points after the two legs of the final, extra time and a penalty shootout would have been played to decide the national champion. If a team won both the Apertura and Clausura, the playoffs would not be played and that team would be declared as champion.

Qualification to international competitions was as follows: the four playoff qualifiers (or the top four teams of the aggregate table in case the playoffs were contested by a lower amount of teams) qualified for the 2021 Copa Libertadores, while the next three best teams in that table qualified for the 2021 Copa Sudamericana, with a fourth berth being allocated to the 2020 Copa Bicentenario winners. With the cancellation of the Copa Bicentenario due to the COVID-19 pandemic, the Copa Sudamericana berth allocated to its winner was transferred to the eighth best team in the aggregate table. The four teams with the fewest points in the aggregate table at the end of the season were to be relegated, unless the Copa Perú was not played this season, in which case only three teams would be relegated. If the Liga 2 was not played this season either, only two teams would be relegated. Eventually, only the Copa Perú was confirmed not to be held this season, with which three teams were relegated from Liga 1 at the end of the season.

Teams
20 teams played in the 2020 Liga 1 season, an increase of two teams from the previous season. The top sixteen teams in the 2019 Liga 1 took part, along with 2019 Liga 2 champions Cienciano, Copa Perú champions Carlos Stein, and the top two teams of the promotion play-offs (Atlético Grau and Deportivo Llacuabamba).

On 23 December 2019, Real Garcilaso announced its name change to Cusco Fútbol Club.

Stadia and locations

Starting from the seventh round of Stage 1, the following stadiums were used to host matches. Estadio Monumental in Lima was also included as a host stadium starting from the second round of Stage 2:

Managerial changes

Effects of the COVID-19 pandemic
On 12 March, the Liga de Fútbol Profesional announced the decision to temporarily suspend the competition after the sixth round of the Torneo Apertura until at least 30 March due to the COVID-19 pandemic.

On 2 June, the Peruvian government through its Ministry of Health and the Instituto Peruano del Deporte (IPD) approved the biosecurity protocol presented by the Peruvian Football Federation to allow the resumption of the competition, authorizing clubs to resume their training sessions. On 8 June, the FPF and the Liga de Fútbol Profesional announced that the league would resume on 31 July with the seventh round of the Torneo Apertura, with training sessions to resume on 22 June. It was also announced that all the remaining matches of the season would be relocated to Lima to avoid the constant travel between cities that clubs must do under normal circumstances, as well as an alteration to the competition format. However, after some delays with COVID-19 testing, the date for resumption was pushed back to 7 August.

On 5 August nine positive cases of COVID-19 were confirmed in Binacional, following the application of tests ordered by the FPF after some players of said club breached the biosecurity protocol upon their arrival to Lima. In response to this finding the FPF's Medical Commission recommended the isolation of the entire Binacional delegation, meaning that their match against Alianza Lima scheduled for 9 August would not be played.

On the evening of 7 August, and due to an agglomeration of Universitario fans in the outskirts of the Estadio Nacional before their club's match against Cantolao breaching biosecurity protocols, the IPD ordered the suspension of the remaining matches scheduled for the seventh round of the Torneo Apertura. On 14 August, and following coordination meetings with authorities and awareness and prevention campaigns performed with fans, the IPD approved the proposal from the FPF to resume the competition on 18 August.

Fase 1

Standings

Results

Fase 2

Group A

Group B

Fase 2 final

Aggregate table
Both stages (1 and 2) of the 2020 season will be aggregated into a single league table throughout the season to determine two of the teams that will qualify for the playoffs and the Copa Libertadores and four Copa Sudamericana qualifiers, as well as those to be relegated at the end of the season.

Alianza Lima and CAS decision

On 28 November 2020, Alianza Lima were relegated to Liga 2 following a 2–0 loss to Sport Huancayo on the last matchday of the season, however, prior to this event the club's board had requested to the FPF the application of a two-point deduction on Carlos Stein for failing to comply with economic regulations. Since the FPF initially ruled that Carlos Stein would only get fined, Alianza Lima lodged an appeal to the Court of Arbitration for Sport (CAS). After months without a final decision and with the 2021 season already underway, on 17 March 2021 the CAS ruled in favor of Alianza Lima and deducted two points from Carlos Stein in the 2020 season's aggregate table, thus reinstating Alianza Lima in the top tier while Carlos Stein ended up relegated.

Playoffs

Semi-final

First leg

Second leg

Sporting Cristal won 6–2 on aggregate and advanced to the finals.

Finals

First leg

Second leg

Sporting Cristal won 3–2 on aggregate.

Top goalscorers

Source: Soccerway

Liga 1 awards
On 1 February 2021, the Liga 1 announced the nominees for the 2020 Liga 1 awards. The award ceremony, originally scheduled for 5 February 2021, 12:00 local time (UTC−5), was held on 15 February 2021, 20:00 local time. The winners were chosen based on voting by coaches and captains of 2020 Liga 1 teams, 50 local sports journalist and Liga 1 fans weighted as follows:

Votes from 2020 Liga 1 coaches: 35%
Votes from 2020 Liga 1 teams captains: 35%
Votes from local sports journalists: 20%
Votes from fans on social media: 10%

The following awards were also awarded:
Top goalscorer:  Emanuel Herrera from Sporting Cristal (20 goals).
Fair Play award: UTC (ranked first in the Fair Play standings with 915 points).

Best XI
The best XI team of the 2020 Liga 1 season was also announced during the award ceremony.

See also
 2020 Copa Bicentenario
 2020 Torneo de Promoción y Reserva
 2020 Liga 2

References

External links
Official website 
Tournament regulations 
Torneo Descentralizado news at Peru.com 
Torneo Descentralizado statistics and news at Dechalaca.com 
Torneo Descentralizado statistics and news at The Peruvian Waltz 

 

2020
Peru
Peru
Peru